Virineya is a 1968 Soviet drama film directed by Vladimir Fetin.

Plot 
Civil War. Virineya is a despised creature in the remote village of Nebesnovka. Clever, beautiful, desperate head, she herself, out of a sense of contradiction, multiplies her notoriety. The acute social and everyday drama tells how the unlucky Virka found her way to personal happiness, participation in a new life, to feat.

Cast 
 Lyudmila Chursina as Virineya
 Vyacheslav Nevinny as Pavel Sluzov
 Anatoliy Papanov as Maraga
 Valentina Vladimirova as Anisya
 Oleg Borisov as Vasily
 Stanislav Chekan as Zhiganov
 Yevgeny Leonov as Mikhailo
 Vyacheslav Shalevich as Ivan Pavlovich, engineer
 Alexey Gribov as investigator
 Vyacheslav Sirin as Frantz
 Irina Gubanova as librarian Antonina Nikolaevna

References

External links 
 

1968 films
1960s Russian-language films
Soviet drama films
1968 drama films
Soviet black-and-white films
Lenfilm films
Soviet films based on plays
Russian Civil War films